Patricia Harty is an Irish-American journalist, author and editor. She is the editor-in-chief and co-founder of Irish America Magazine.

Biography
Patricia Harty co-founded Irish America Magazine along with publisher Niall O'Dowd in October 1985. Among Harty's many interviews in the past 25 years are Nobel Prize-winning poet Seamus Heaney, Wall Street guru Peter Lynch, best-selling author Pat Conroy, Hollywood legend Gregory Peck, 2015 Nobel Prize in Medicine recipient William Campbell, and corporate titan Jack Welch.

In 2017 Harty was honored with the Presidential Distinguished Service Award for the Irish abroad and in 2009 she received the Ambassador Award from the St. Patrick's Committee of Holyoke, Massachusetts for her work "to promote the relationship between the people of the Republic of Ireland and the people of the United States."

She was twice honored by the Office of the Comptroller of the City of New York for her "outstanding journalistic contributions to the Irish community in New York and throughout the United States."

And in 2000, she was made a Citizen of the Bronx by Fernando James "Freddy" Ferrer, the Bronx Borough President.

Harty, who is a native of Tipperary, also serves on the board of Glucksman Ireland House, NYU's center for Irish studies. She serves on the Irish Repertory Theater's Advisory Board, and on the committee for the annual Women of Concern Luncheon which raises funds for the Irish relief organization Concern Worldwide.

In addition to her book, Greatest Irish Americans of the 20th Century, Harty contributed essays to Being Irish: Personal Reflections on Irish Identity Today, edited by Paddy Logue, and The Irish Face in America by Julia McNamara.

References

External links
 Interview with Patricia Harty
 Irish America Magazine at Irishcentral.com
 Patricia Harty's blog on Irishcentral.com

Living people
American people of Irish descent
Year of birth missing (living people)
American women journalists
21st-century American women